Tímea Babos was the defending champion, but chose not to participate.

Madison Keys won the title defeating Eugenie Bouchard in the final 6–4, 6–2.

Seeds

Main draw

Finals

Top half

Bottom half

References 
 Main draw
 Qualifying draw

Challenger Banque Nationale de Saguenay
Challenger de Saguenay